Western Piedmont Community College is a public community college in Morganton, North Carolina. It was chartered on April 2, 1964, as a member of the North Carolina Community College System. The college is the home of the Sam J. Ervin Library, dedicated to the veteran U.S. senator and Morganton native, who chaired the Senate Watergate hearings in 1973.

The school's nickname is the Pioneers.

References

External links 
 Official website

Two-year colleges in the United States
Vocational education in the United States
North Carolina Community College System colleges
Universities and colleges accredited by the Southern Association of Colleges and Schools
Education in Burke County, North Carolina
Buildings and structures in Burke County, North Carolina
1964 establishments in North Carolina